"At Christmas Time" is a 1900 short story by Anton Chekhov.

Publication
On 1 December Sergey Khudekov, the editor and publisher of Peterburgskaya  Gazeta sent Chekhov a letter asking for a Christmas story. By late December the story had been finished. It appeared in the No.1, January 1899 edition of this newspaper. With some minor changes Chekhov included it into Volume 12 of the 1903, second edition  the Collected Works by A.P. Chekhov, published by Adolf Marks. It then appeared in Volume 11 of the posthumous, 1906 third edition.

References

External links
 На святках, the original Russian text
 At Christmas Time, the English translation 

Short stories by Anton Chekhov
1900 short stories
Works originally published in Russian newspapers